Mark VII Limited was the production company of actor and filmmaker Jack Webb, and was active from 1951 to his death in 1982. Many of its series were produced in association with Universal Television; most of them aired on the NBC television network in the U.S.  Coincidentally, NBC and Universal are today part of the same company.

The estate of Jack Webb now owns the full rights to the company's library, with the exception of the original 1954 feature film version of Dragnet (originally released by Warner Bros., but now owned by Universal Pictures), and the films Pete Kelly's Blues and The D.I. (which are controlled by original distributor Warner Bros.). 

However, Webb's three seminal series, Dragnet (the 1967–1970 incarnation), Emergency!, and Adam-12, are now available on DVD from either Universal or Shout! Factory, the first two under license from the Webb estate, the latter in-house since Universal was reassigned the Adam-12 series copyright. The MeTV and Cozi TV Television Networks also air episodes of the Mark VII Limited shows.

Programs produced by Mark VII 
All series aired on NBC except as noted.

Dragnet, 1951–1959
Noah's Ark, 1956–1957
The D.A.'s Man, 1959
Pete Kelly's Blues, 1959
GE True, 1962–1963 (CBS)
Temple Houston, 1963–1964
Dragnet, 1967–1970
Adam-12, 1968–1975
The D.A., 1971–1972
O'Hara, U.S. Treasury, 1971–1972 (CBS)
Emergency!, 1972–1977
Hec Ramsey,  1972–1974
Escape, 1973
Chase, 1973–1974
Sierra, 1974
Mobile One, 1975 (ABC)
Little Mo, 1978 TV movie
Project U.F.O., 1978–1979
Sam, 1978 (CBS)

Mark VII's final production was The 25th Man, an unsold television pilot that aired on NBC in 1982.

Production logo

Mark VII Limited was known for its famous production logo attached to the end of its productions. The logo, in use in one form or another for much of the company's existence, showed the hands of Jack Webb's construction foreman Harold C. Nyby holding a stamp against a sheet of metal. As a timpani roll played, he struck two blows on the stamp with a hammer and then removed both tools to reveal the Roman numeral VII indented into the sheet. 

The origin of the name "Mark VII" is unclear. One source said the name meant nothing, and that it was made up over coffee one day. Another source says Webb just liked the look of the Roman numerals.

The Mark VII production logo is one of the more recognizable logos of its time and has become iconic, with many instances of filmmakers and production companies paying homage to it in various ways, most notably Williams Street Productions, originally Ghost Planet Industries, of Adult Swim/Cartoon Network programming, whose logo utilizes the same drumroll/hammer clinks soundtrack seen on the 1967 Mark VII logo. The Mark VII Limited logo was also spoofed at the end of the 1954 Woody Woodpecker cartoon Under The Counter Spy. In this spoof, the man accidentally hits his thumb with the hammer and yells "OUCH!", then pulls the hammer away to reveal the ending title card. The man's voice was supplied by Daws Butler. The 1955 Three Stooges' short Blunder Boys not only was a parody of Dragnet, but ended with Larry being stamped with "VII 1/2 The End" on his forehead. Gunther-Wahl Productions used a similar card at the end of its cartoons.

The logo was remade multiple times during the company's history. It is reported that the early logos featured Jack Webb's hands but the later logos featured Ivan Martin's. Ivan was the director of studio operations for 20th Century Fox at the time of his retirement but worked in the studio's visual effects department during production of the logos.

In an episode of The Dick Van Dyke Show, Rob Petrie references the "Mark VII " logo to a police officer when referencing the end of a case where his dining room table had been stolen.

Filmmaker Spike Lee pays homage to this famous logo in the logo for his own production company 40 Acres and a Mule Filmworks. In addition, the sound of the hammer striking the stamp was used in the intro to the WWE entrance music of wrestler Greg "The Hammer" Valentine.

References

Defunct film and television production companies of the United States
Entertainment companies based in California
Companies based in Los Angeles
Defunct companies based in Greater Los Angeles
Entertainment companies established in 1951
Mass media companies established in 1951
Mass media companies disestablished in 1982
1951 establishments in California
1982 disestablishments in California
American film studios